The Benoni Defense is a chess opening characterized by an early reply of ...c5 against White's opening move 1.d4. Most commonly, it is reached by the sequence:

1. d4 Nf6
2. c4 c5
3. d5

Black can then sacrifice a pawn with 3...b5 (the Benko Gambit), otherwise 3...e6 is the most common move. (3...d6 or 3...g6 are also seen, typically transposing to main lines.)

The Old Benoni Defense is characterized by 
1. d4 c5

This gives Black other options such as an early ...f5, but has the drawback that White is no longer committed to playing c4 after the response 2.d5.

Etymology
Benoni (or "Ben-Oni")  is an ancient Hebrew name, still occasionally used, meaning "son of my sorrow". It is a reference to the Biblical account of the dying Rachel giving birth to Benjamin, whom she named Ben-Oni.(Genesis 35:18)

In 1825 Aaron Reinganum, a prominent member of the Frankfurt Jewish community, published a book entitled Ben-Oni oder die Vertheidigungen gegen die Gambitzüge im Schache in which he analyzed several defences to the King's Gambit and the Queen's Gambit, as well as the then unknown opening 1.d4 c5. Reinganum, who studied chess to alleviate his depression, conceived the name "Ben-Oni" as a nickname for his writings rather than the name of an opening.

In the 1843 Staunton–Saint Amant match, Saint Amant met 1.d4 with 1...c5 in the second and fourth games. Saint Amant wrote in Le Palamède (1843): "This opening is not favorable to Black. Bennoni [sic] gives some examples; but it loses time to White, which deprives Black of all the advantages of a good opening." Staunton wrote in The Chess-Player's Companion (1849): "M. St. Amant derived this somewhat bizarre defence from Benoni. (Benoni, oder Vertheidigungen die Gambitzüge im Schache, &c. Von Aaron Reinganum, Frankfort, 1825.)" Staunton also mentions "Ben-Oni" while commenting on the move 1...c5 in The Chess-player's Handbook (1847, page 382).

Subsequently, the name "Benoni" came to be associated with the opening 1.d4 c5, and later with 1.d4 Nf6 2.c4 c5 and other openings in which Black counters d2–d4 with an early ....c7–c5, without first having played ...d7–d5.

Old Benoni: 1.d4 c5 

The Old Benoni starts with 1.d4 c5. White usually replies 2.d5 in order to gain , as 2.dxc5 e6 leads to no advantage, and 2.e4 transposes to the Morra Gambit, also promising  at best. The Old Benoni may transpose to the Czech Benoni, but there are a few independent variations. This form has never attracted serious interest in high-level play, though Alexander Alekhine defeated Efim Bogoljubow with it in one game of their second match, in 1934. The Old Benoni is sometimes called the Blackburne Defense after Englishman Joseph Henry Blackburne, the first player known to have used it successfully.

Czech Benoni: 1.d4 Nf6 2.c4 c5 3.d5 e5 

In the Czech Benoni, also known as the Hromadka Benoni, after Karel Hromádka, Black plays 1.d4 Nf6 2.c4 c5 3.d5 e5. The Czech Benoni is more  than the Modern Benoni, but also more passive. Grandmaster Ben Finegold often plays this line; he notably beat Mamedyarov in this variation.

Modern Benoni: 1.d4 Nf6 2.c4 c5 3.d5 e6 

The Modern Benoni, 1.d4 Nf6 2.c4 c5 3.d5 e6, is the second most common form of Benoni after the Benko Gambit. Black's intention is to play ...exd5 and create a  pawn , whose advance will be supported by a fianchettoed bishop on g7. The combination of these two features differentiates Black's setup from the other Benoni defenses and the King's Indian Defense, although transpositions between these openings are common.  The Modern Benoni is classified under the ECO codes A60–A79.

Snake Benoni: 4.Nc3 exd5 5.cxd5 Bd6 

The Snake Benoni refers to a variant of the Modern Benoni where the bishop is developed to d6 rather than g7. This opening was invented in 1982 by Rolf Olav Martens, who gave it its name because of the sinuous movement of the bishop—in Martens's original concept, Black follows up with 6...Bc7 and sometimes ...Ba5—and because the Swedish word for "snake", orm, was an anagram of his initials. Normunds Miezis has been a regular exponent of this variation. Aside from Martens's plan, 6...0-0 intending ...Re8, ...Bf8 and a potential redeployment of the bishop to g7, has also been tried. White appears to retain the advantage against both setups.

Benko Gambit 1.d4 Nf6 2.c4 c5 3.d5 b5

Blumenfeld Countergambit 1.d4 Nf6 2.c4 c5 3.d5 e6 4.Nf3 b5

ECO
The Encyclopaedia of Chess Openings has many codes for the Benoni Defense.

Old Benoni Defense:
A43 1.d4 c5
A44 1.d4 c5 2.d5 e5

Benoni Defense:
A56 1.d4 Nf6 2.c4 c5 (includes Czech Benoni)
A57–A59 1.d4 Nf6 2.c4 c5 3.d5 b5 (Benko Gambit)
A60 1.d4 Nf6 2.c4 c5 3.d5 e6
A61 1.d4 Nf6 2.c4 c5 3.d5 e6 4.Nc3 exd5 5.cxd5 d6 6.Nf3 g6

Fianchetto Variation:
A62 1.d4 Nf6 2.c4 c5 3.d5 e6 4.Nc3 exd5 5.cxd5 d6 6.Nf3 g6 7.g3 Bg7 8.Bg2 0-0
A63 1.d4 Nf6 2.c4 c5 3.d5 e6 4.Nc3 exd5 5.cxd5 d6 6.Nf3 g6 7.g3 Bg7 8.Bg2 0-0 9.0-0 Nbd7
A64 1.d4 Nf6 2.c4 c5 3.d5 e6 4.Nc3 exd5 5.cxd5 d6 6.Nf3 g6 7.g3 Bg7 8.Bg2 0-0 9.0-0 Nbd7 10.Nd2 a6 11.a4 Re8

Modern Benoni:
A65 1.d4 Nf6 2.c4 c5 3.d5 e6 4.Nc3 exd5 5.cxd5 d6 6.e4
A66 1.d4 Nf6 2.c4 c5 3.d5 e6 4.Nc3 exd5 5.cxd5 d6 6.e4 g6 7.f4

Taimanov Variation:
A67 1.d4 Nf6 2.c4 c5 3.d5 e6 4.Nc3 exd5 5.cxd5 d6 6.e4 g6 7.f4 Bg7 8.Bb5+

Four Pawns Attack:
A68 1.d4 Nf6 2.c4 c5 3.d5 e6 4.Nc3 exd5 5.cxd5 d6 6.e4 g6 7.f4 Bg7 8.Nf3 0-0
A69 1.d4 Nf6 2.c4 c5 3.d5 e6 4.Nc3 exd5 5.cxd5 d6 6.e4 g6 7.f4 Bg7 8.Nf3 0-0 9.Be2 Re8

Classical Benoni:
A70 1.d4 Nf6 2.c4 c5 3.d5 e6 4.Nc3 exd5 5.cxd5 d6 6.e4 g6 7.Nf3
A71 1.d4 Nf6 2.c4 c5 3.d5 e6 4.Nc3 exd5 5.cxd5 d6 6.e4 g6 7.Nf3 Bg7 8.Bg5
A72 1.d4 Nf6 2.c4 c5 3.d5 e6 4.Nc3 exd5 5.cxd5 d6 6.e4 g6 7.Nf3 Bg7 8.Be2 0-0
A73 1.d4 Nf6 2.c4 c5 3.d5 e6 4.Nc3 exd5 5.cxd5 d6 6.e4 g6 7.Nf3 Bg7 8.Be2 0-0 9.0-0
A74 1.d4 Nf6 2.c4 c5 3.d5 e6 4.Nc3 exd5 5.cxd5 d6 6.e4 g6 7.Nf3 Bg7 8.Be2 0-0 9.0-0 a6
A75 1.d4 Nf6 2.c4 c5 3.d5 e6 4.Nc3 exd5 5.cxd5 d6 6.e4 g6 7.Nf3 Bg7 8.Be2 0-0 9.0-0 a6 10.a4 Bg4
A76 1.d4 Nf6 2.c4 c5 3.d5 e6 4.Nc3 exd5 5.cxd5 d6 6.e4 g6 7.Nf3 Bg7 8.Be2 0-0 9.0-0 Re8
A77 1.d4 Nf6 2.c4 c5 3.d5 e6 4.Nc3 exd5 5.cxd5 d6 6.e4 g6 7.Nf3 Bg7 8.Be2 0-0 9.0-0 Re8 10.Nd2
A78 1.d4 Nf6 2.c4 c5 3.d5 e6 4.Nc3 exd5 5.cxd5 d6 6.e4 g6 7.Nf3 Bg7 8.Be2 0-0 9.0-0 Re8 10.Nd2 Na6
A79 1.d4 Nf6 2.c4 c5 3.d5 e6 4.Nc3 exd5 5.cxd5 d6 6.e4 g6 7.Nf3 Bg7 8.Be2 0-0 9.0-0 Re8 10.Nd2 Na6 11.f3

See also
 Franco-Benoni Defence (1.e4 e6 2.d4 c5)

Notes

References

Further reading

Chess openings